Raja Mehdi Ali Khan (23 September 1915 – 29 July 1966) was an Indian poet, writer and a lyricist.

Early life and career
Raja Mehdi Ali Khan was born on 23 September 1915 at  Karamabad village, near Wazirabad, Gujranwala District of Punjab, British India. Mehdi Ali lost his father when he was four. His mother Hubia Khanum who was the sister of Maulana Zafar Ali Khan, got him  educated and he completed his basic education at Islamia College (Lahore). 

As he grew up, Mehdi Ali started working at the editorial staff of Phool and Tehzeeb-e-Niswan Urdu magazineas from Lahore. Then he joined as a writer at the All India Radio, Delhi in 1942. Here he got acquainted with the noted writer Saadat Hasan Manto. Manto, who was active in the Hindi film industry, asked film actor Ashok Kumar to find Mehdi Ali some kind of a job. He soon got a film called Aath Din (1946) in which he not only wrote dialogues but also acted. Sashadhar Mukherjee, one of the partners in Filmistan Studio, gave Mehdi Ali a chance to write lyrics for his film, Do Bhai (1947). Songs from the film such as "Mera Sunder Sapna Beet Gaya" and "Yaad Karoge" became instant hits.

In 1947, Mehdi and his wife Tahira decided to stay in India instead of migrating to Pakistan. They came to this decision despite the wave of riots plaguing the country. In 1948, his patriotism manifested in his songs, "Watan Ki Raah Mein" and "Todi Todi Bachche", which were used in the film Shaheed.

He worked with music composers including Sachin Dev Burman, Iqbal Qureshi, Babul, S. Mohinder, Chic Chocolate, and Rono Mukherjee. He also wrote songs for C. Ramchandra, Datta Naik ("Sare Jahan Se Acha Hindustan Hamara"), O. P. Nayyar ("Main Pyar Ka Raahi Hoon") and Laxmikant Pyarelal ("Jaal","Anita").

He formed a successful partnership with Madan Mohan which began with Madhosh in 1951. It was also Madan Mohan's third film as a music director. The two shared a great rapport and their later collaborations in films such as Anpadh, Mera Saaya, Woh Kaun Thi?, Neela Akash, Dulhan Ek Raat Ki, Anita and Nawab Siraj-ud-Daulah proved to be massive hits. His song Lag Jaa Gale from Woh Kaun Thi? was named among the top ten all-time favorites in film history to be "retired" from Antakshari on Zee TV.

Raja Mehadi Ali Khan also worked with Laxmikant-Pyarelal for Raj Khosla musical Anita, 1967
Samne Mere Sawariyan, Tum Bin Jeevan Kaise Beeta. Second film was Jaal, 1967.

Death
He died in Mumbai on 29 July 1966. He and his wife Tahira, remained childless even though he himself loved to interact with children.

It is said that when he was seriously ill and was on his deathbed, even then he kept his humorous side and was seen laughing with his visitors.

Films and popular songs

 Mera sundar sapna beet gaya — Do Bhai (1947)

 Watan Ki Raah Mein — Shaheed (1948)

 Preetam meri dunya mein do din tau rahe hotay — Ada (1951)

 Meri yaad me tum na aansoo bahaana — Madhosh (1951)

 Raat sard sard hai — Jaali Note (1960)

 Poochho na humein — Mitti Me Sona (1960)

 Aap yuhin agar hum se milte rahe — Ek Musafir Ek Haseena (1962)

 Maye pyar ka raahi hoon — Ek Musafir Ek Haseena (1962)

 Aap ki nazron ne samjha pyar ke qaabil mujhe — Anpadh (1962)

 Hai issi me pyar ki aabroo — Anpadh (1962)

 Jiya lay gayo ri mera sanwaria — Anpadh (1962)

 Agar mujhse mohabbat hai, mujhe sab apne gham de do — Aap Ki Parchhaiyan (1964)

 Main nigaahen tere chehre se — Aap Ki Parchhaiyan (1964)

 Jo hum ne dastaan apni sunaai, aap kyun roye — Woh Kaun Thi? (1964)

 Lagg ja gale ke phir yeh raat ho na ho — Woh Kaun Thi? (1964)

 Naina barse rimjhim rimjhim — Woh Kaun Thi? (1964)

 Aakhri geet mohabbat ka — Neela Aakash (1965)

 Tere paas aa ke mera waqt — Neela Aakash (1965)

 Nainon me badra chhaye — Mera Saaya (1966)

 Tu jahan jahan chalega mera saaya saath hoga — Mera Saaya (1966)

 Aap ke paheloo me aa kar ro diye — Mera Saaya (1966)

 Jhumka Gira Re Bareilli ke bazaar mein — Mera Saaya (1966)

 Sapno me agar mere tum aao — Dulhan Ek Raat Ki (1967)

 Kayee din se ji hai bekal — Dulhan Ek Raat Ki (1967)

 Ek haseen sham ko — Dulhan Ek Raat Ki (1967)

 Tere Bin sawaan kaise beeta — Jab Yaad Kisi Ki Aati Hai (1967)

 Aari o shokh kaliyion muskuraa dena — Jab Yaad Kisi Ki Aati Hai (1967)

 Akela hoon mein humsafar dhoondta hoon — Jaal (1967)

 Tum bin jeevan kaise beeta poochho mere dil se — Anita (1967)

References

External links
 
 

Urdu-language lyricists
Hindi-language lyricists
Indian lyricists
Indian male songwriters
1966 deaths
1915 births
People from Wazirabad
20th-century Indian musicians
Place of death missing